Shinsui Itō (4 February 1898 – 8 May 1972) was the pseudonym of a Nihonga painter and ukiyo-e woodblock print artist in Taishō- and Shōwa-period Japan. He was one of the great names of the shin-hanga art movement, which revitalized the traditional art after it began to decline with the advent of photography in the early 20th century. His real name was Itō Hajime.

Biography 
Itō was born in the Fukagawa district of Tokyo. After unwise investments bankrupted his father's business, he was forced to drop out of elementary school in the third grade and became a live-in apprentice at a printing shop. It was in this manner that he became interested in printing techniques and also in the arts.

In 1911, Itō was accepted as an apprentice under Kaburagi Kiyokata, (who gave him the pseudonym of "Shinsui") and issued his first woodblock print the following year. His talent was soon apparent, and from the following year, his paintings were entered in public exhibitions.

In 1912, his works were first shown by the Tatsumi gakai ("Southeast Painting Society") and later works were displayed by the Kyodokai ("Homeland Society"), the Nihon bijutsuin (Japan Art Institute), and in the government sponsored Bunten show. His works were received with much praise by art critics, and his reputation was soon made. His early works won numerous awards, and he accepted a post at the Tokyo Nichi Nichi Shimbun to supply illustrations for newspapers.

As with most artists of the shin-hanga movement (notably Kawase Hasui), Itō was spotted by publisher Watanabe Shōzaburō, who effectively monopolized the market. Itō came to be known as a specialist in the bijin-ga ("picture[s] of beautiful women") genre, although he also occasionally painted landscapes.

Itō's first major print, "Before the Mirror", depicts a young woman wearing a deep red kimono under-robe, looking off into an unseen mirror. Instead of using the harsh aniline red common in other contemporary prints, Itō used a natural vegetable dye, overprinting the robe several times to achieve a rich crimson color. Special care was also taken for the speckled gray texture background, making a contrast with the red garment, black hair, and white skin.

Itō's early landscape series, Eight Views of Lake Biwa inspired Kawase Hasui. His early bijin-ga are generally considered his finest works, including Twelve Figures of New Beauties  (1922–1923).

Itō established his own independent studio in 1927. Although many of his early works were direct reflections of traditional ukiyo-e both in subject matter and in style, his technique was revolutionary. Ito would paint a "master painting" in watercolors, and dedicated craftsmen would make the actual prints from this "master copy". Itō was thus a pioneer in the shin-hanga movement. Watanabe and Itō continued their business cooperation into the 1960s, and Watanabe exported thousands of Shinsui prints, generating great success for them both.

During the Pacific War, Itō was drafted by the Japanese government into producing propaganda art. He was sent to the South Pacific and Japanese-occupied Netherlands East Indies, and completed over 3000 sketches during his travels to various islands under Japanese rule. At the end of the war, he relocated from the ruins of Tokyo to Komoro in the mountains of Nagano Prefecture. He relocated from there to Kamakura, Kanagawa, in 1949.

In the post-war period Itō came to be regarded as one of the best known and respected personalities in Japanese society, and received several important honors during his lifetime. In 1952 the "Commission for the Protection of Cultural Properties" (Bunkazai Hōgō Iinkai) declared his woodblock designing talent to be of "intangible cultural properties" (mukei bunkazai) which was then the equivalent of being declared a Living National Treasure. In 1958, he became a member of the Japan Art Academy. In 1970, he received the Order of the Rising Sun.

One of Itō's works, Yubi, ("Finger") was the subject of the 1974 Philatelic Week commemorative postage stamp issued by the Japanese post office. Another work, Fubuki ("Blizzard") was depicted on a 1983 Japanese commemorative postage stamp as part of the Modern Japanese Arts series.

Itō's daughter, Yukiji Asaoka, is an actress and singer. Itō died in 1972 of cancer. His grave is at the temple of Ryūsō-in in Shinagawa, Tokyo.

Major works
Eight Views of Lake Biwa – 1917–1918
Twelve Figures of New Beauties – 1922–1923
Collection of Modern Beauties – 1929–1931
Twelve Views of Ōshima – 1937–1938
Three Views of Mount Fuji – 1938–1939
Ten Views of Shinano – 1948
 Incense Party (聞香, Monkō) - 1950

His work is held in several museums worldwide, including the Virginia Museum of Fine Art, the Toledo Museum of Art, the Hiroshima Museum of Art, the Fine Arts Museums of San Francisco, the Minneapolis Institute of Art, the Museum of Fine Arts, Boston, the University of Michigan Museum of Art, the Indianapolis Museum of Art, the Hood Museum of Art, the Columbus Museum of Art, the Museum of Modern Art, Kamakura & Hayama, the Los Angeles County Museum of Art, the Brooklyn Museum, the Harvard Art Museums, and the British Museum.

References

 Merritt, Helen and Nanako Yamada.  (1995). Guide to Modern Japanese Woodblock Prints, 1900-1975. Honolulu: University of Hawaii Press.	; ;  OCLC 247995392

External links

Ito Shinsui Information, print gallery,...
Ito Shinsui's works at Los Angeles County Museum of Art
Brief biography of Ito Shinsui - Jyuluck-Do Corporation
Artworks and history of Ito Shinsui

1898 births
1972 deaths
Deaths from cancer in Japan
Japanese printmakers
Nihonga painters
Artists from Tokyo
People of Shōwa-period Japan
Recipients of the Order of the Rising Sun
Shin hanga artists
20th-century Japanese painters
20th-century printmakers
Artists from Tokyo Metropolis